The Tulama  are an Oromo subgroup inhabiting the Shewa Zones of Oromia, Ethiopia, East Shewa Zone, North Shewa Zone (Oromia), Oromia Special Zone Surrounding Addis Ababa).

See also 
 List of Oromo subgroups and clans

References 

Ethnic groups in Ethiopia
Oromo groups
Borana Oromo